Henri Basset (7 November 1892 – 13 April 1926) was a 20th-century French historian, orientalist and linguist and a Berberologist.

Biography 
The son of René Basset and elder brother of André Basset, Henri Basset joined the École Normale Supérieure in 1912. A teacher at the "École supérieure de langue arabe et de dialectes berbères" from 1916, he passed his doctorate in 1920 at the faculté de Lettres of Algiers with two works entitled Essai sur la littérature des Berbères and  Le culte des grottes au Maroc and was appointed the same year deputy director of the Institut des hautes études marocaines.

Bibliography 
1920: Essai sur la littérature des Berbères (Paris: Ibis press - Awal, 2001 )
1920: Le culte des grottes au Maroc,  Alger: J. Carbonel, (Clichy: Éd. du Jasmin, 1999 )
1921: Graffiti de Chella, Hespéris I with J. Campardou, (p. 87–90), fig.
1922: Les rites de la laine à Rabat", Hespéris II,  (p. 139–160)
1923: Chella. Une nécropole mérinide, with Évariste Lévi-Provençal, Paris, E. Larose
1923: Deux pétroglyphes du Maroc Occidental, région des Zaer, Hespéris III,  (p. 141–145), 2 pl.
1923: Le Nouveau manuscrit berbère : le Kitâb el-mawįẓa, Journal Asiatique. I/299-303
1927: La tradition almohade à Marrakech: 1 °. À l'époque mérinide : La mosquée et le minaret de Ben Salîh. Le minaret de Moulay el Ksour : 2 °. À l'époque sa'dienne : La mosquée Mouassin, Hespéris VII, with Henri Terrasse,  (p. 247–345), fig., pl.
1924: Sanctuaires et forteresses almohades: I. Tinmel : II. Les deux Kotobîya, Hespéris 4, with Henri Terrasse, pp. 9-2, 181-04; III. Le Minaret de la Kotobîya, Hespéris V (1925),  (p. 311–376); III. Minaret de la Kotobiya (suite) : IV. Oratoire de la Kotobiya : V. Chaire de la Kotobiya : VI. Mosquée de la Qasba, Hespéris VI (1926), (p. 107–270); Le ribât de Tît : Le Tasghîmout, Hespéris VII (1927),  (p. 117–171).
1932: Sanctuaires et forteresses almohades, with Henri Terrasse, Paris: Larose, VIII-483 p.

External links 
 Henri Basset on BiblioMonde
 Obituary on Revue Africaine
 Henri Basset on Wikisource

French orientalists
Linguists from France
École Normale Supérieure alumni
20th-century French historians
People from Lunéville
1892 births
1926 deaths
Berberologists
20th-century linguists